Earth Opera is the eponymous first studio album by the psychedelic rock band Earth Opera. It was recorded and released in 1968 on Elektra Records. The group featured Peter Rowan and David Grisman, who made their solo careers in much different genres than this record of mainly psychedelic music.

Track listing 
All compositions by Peter Rowan, unless otherwise noted
 "The Red Sox are Winning" – 3:34
 "As It Is Before" – 7:25
 "Dreamless" – 2:52
 "To Care at All" – 3:35
 "Home of the Brave" – 4:51
 "The Child Bride" – 4:43
 "Close Your Eyes and Shut the Door" – 2:46
 "Time and Again" (Grisman, Rowan) – 5:47
 "When You Were Full of Wonder" – 4:00
 "Death by Fire" – 6:08

Personnel 
 Peter Rowan – guitars, vocals
 David Grisman – mandolin, mandocello
 Bill Stevenson – piano, harpsichord, organ, vibraphone
 John Nagy – bass
 Paul Dillon – drums
 Billy Mundi – drums, percussion
 Warren Smith — drums, percussion

References 

1968 albums
Elektra Records albums
Earth Opera albums